is a Japanese stir-fried dish consisting of thick, smooth, white udon noodles mixed with a soy-based sauce, meat (usually pork), and vegetables. It is similar to yakisoba, which involves a similar stir-frying technique using ramen-style wheat noodles. Yaki udon is relatively simple to make and popular as a staple of Japan's izakaya, or pubs, eaten frequently as a late night snack. It originated in Kokura, Fukuoka Prefecture, in southern Japan after the Pacific War. The widely accepted story of how the dish was created dates back to just after World War II, when food was scarce. The owner of the noodle restaurant Darumado used udon noodles in popular yakisoba preparations, because the proper noodles were not available.

See also
 Yaki udon (Korean regional dish)

References

External links

 Kokura Yakiudon Kenkyujo 
 

Udon
Fried noodles
Japanese noodle dishes